The Caribbean elaenia (Elaenia martinica) is a species of bird in the family Tyrannidae found in the West Indies and parts of Central America. Its natural habitats are tropical and subtropical dry broadleaf forest, subtropical or tropical moist lowland forest, and heavily degraded former forest.

Taxonomy
In 1760 the French zoologist Mathurin Jacques Brisson included a description of the Caribbean elaenia in his Ornithologie based on a specimen collected on the island of Martinique. He used the French name Le gobe-mouche hupé de la Martinique and the Latin Muscicapa Martinicana cristata. Although Brisson coined Latin names, these do not conform to the binomial system and are not recognised by the International Commission on Zoological Nomenclature. When in 1766 the Swedish naturalist Carl Linnaeus updated his Systema Naturae for the twelfth edition, he added 240 species that had been previously described by Brisson. One of these was the Caribbean elaenia. Linnaeus included a brief description, coined the binomial name Muscicapa martinica and cited Brisson's work. This species is now placed in the genus Elaenia that was introduced by the Swedish zoologist Carl Jakob Sundevall in 1836.

Seven subspecies are recognized:
 Elaenia martinica riisii Sclater, 1860 - Puerto Rico, Virgin Is., Anguilla, St. Martin, St. Bartholomew, Antigua and Barbuda, and Netherlands Antilles
 Elaenia martinica martinica (Linnaeus, 1766) - Lesser Antilles
 Elaenia martinica barbadensis Cory, 1888 - Barbados
 Elaenia martinica remota von Berlepsch, 1907 - (San Andrés and Providencia)
 Elaenia martinica chinchorrensis Griscom, 1926 - Great Cay Island (off eastern Mexico) and nearby cays
 Elaenia martinica cinerescens Ridgway, 1884 - Islands off Honduras
 Elaenia martinica caymanensis von Berlepsch, 1907 - Cayman Islands

Its natural habitats are tropical and subtropical dry broadleaf forests, subtropical or tropical moist lowland forest, and heavily degraded former forest.

References

External links
Stamps (for Anguilla, Antigua and Barbuda, Barbados, Barbuda, Cayman Islands, Montserrat, Saint Kitts and Nevis, and Saint Lucia)
Stamp photo
Caribbean elaenia photo gallery VIREO; Photo-linked at natureserve.org

Caribbean elaenia
Birds of the Caribbean
Birds of the Cayman Islands
Birds of the Yucatán Peninsula
Caribbean elaenia
Caribbean elaenia
Taxonomy articles created by Polbot